The Panoriyas is an Odia-speaking community in Tripura, India. They are generally concentrated to western Tripura. Originally migrating from Odisha, they community is largely settled near tea gardens.

Earlier members of the community used 'Panoriya' as their surname. In recent times many members of the community has taken surnames like Nayak, Adhikari and Tanti. They community largely ignores the varna hierarchy.

References

Ethnic groups in Tripura
Odia culture